Earl Barish (born 1943 in Fort William, Ontario) is a businessman from Winnipeg, Manitoba, Canada. His family developed the Dickie Dee ice cream brand.

He was also behind the IBA (the International Basketball Association) team, the Winnipeg Cyclone.

In March 2006, Barish was appointed President and CEO of 4328796 Manitoba Ltd. This numbered company was the major shareholder in Salisbury House, a chain of 22 (at the time of Barish's nomination) restaurants in the Winnipeg area. The chain was sold in December 2017 to a partnership that includes restaurateur Noel Bernier, the Metis Economic Development Fund (MEDF), David Filmon, and several senior managers of Salisbury House. In July 2019, it was announced that Barish had purchased the Salisbury House chain back less than two years after selling it.

In June 2008, Barish was appointed the Chairman of the Board of B'nai Brith Canada.

Barish also served on the Executive Committee of Maccabi Canada.

See also
Alan Gould, From Winnipeg to the World, How sweet it is!, The story of Earl Barish, Dickie Dee, CAY and the IBA, 2000.

References

Canadian Jews
Businesspeople from Ontario
Businesspeople from Winnipeg
People from Thunder Bay
1944 births
Living people